Robert Leighton may refer to:

Robert Leighton (bishop) (1611–1684), Scottish preacher, Bishop of Dunblane, Archbishop of Glasgow, & academic
Robert Leighton (author) (1858–1934), British author of historical adventure fiction and books about Dogs
Robert Leighton (cartoonist) (born 1960), American writer, puzzle writer and cartoonist
Robert B. Leighton (1919–1997), American physicist
Robert Leighton (broadcaster) (1956–2008), English broadcaster
Robert Leighton (film editor), British film editor
Robert Leighton (MP) (born 1628), MP for Shrewsbury (UK Parliament constituency) 1661–1679